Juan Andrés Morales Milohnic (born 1962) is a Chilean poet and writer. He has a PhD in literature and is a full professor of the University of Chile, and a member of Academia Chilena de la Lengua (Chilean Academy of Spanish Language). He won the Pablo Neruda National Prize in 2001.

He was born in Santiago.

Poetry
 Por ínsulas extrañas (1982)
 Soliloquio de fuego (1984)
 Lázaro siempre llora (1985)
 No el azar/Hors du hasard (translated to French, 1987)
 Ejercicio del decir (1989)
 Verbo (1991)
 Vicio de belleza (1992)
 Visión del oráculo (1993)
 Fragments of the Age of Objects (translated to English, 1994)
 Romper los ojos (1995)
 El arte de la guerra (1995)
 Oracle and other poems (translated to English, 1997)
 Escenas del derrumbe de Occidente (1998)
 Réquiem (2001)
 Antología Personal (2001)
 Izabrane Pjesme (translated to Croatian, 2002)
 Memoria Muerta (2003)
 Demonio de la nada (2005)
 Los Cantos de la Sibila (2009)

Essays and anthologies
 Antología Poética de Vicente Huidobro (1993)
 Un ángulo del mundo. Muestra de poesía iberoamericana actual (1993)
 Poesía croata contemporánea (1997)
 Anguitología, Poesía y Prosa de Eduardo Anguita (1999)
 España reunida: Antología poética de la guerra civil española (1999)
 Altazor de puño y letra (1999)
 Poesía y Prosa de Miguel Arteche (2001)
 De Palabra y Obra (2003)

Awards
 Prize of Poetry "Manantial", Universidad de Chile (1980)
 Prize of Poetry "Miguel Hernández"(Buenos Aires, Argentina, 1983)
 Fellowship Pablo Neruda of Pablo Neruda Foundation (1988)
 International Fellowship for Hispanic Studies, Ministerio de Asuntos Exteriores de España (Madrid, Spain, 1995)
 National Fellowship of Culture and Arts of 1992 and 1996
 National Fellowship of Creative Writing 2001, Fundación Andes, Chile
 National Prize of Poetry Pablo Neruda 2001
 Fellowship of Creative Writing, National Council of Culture and Arts of Chile 2001, 2004 and 2008
 Essay Prize “Centro Cultural de España” 2002 and 2003
 International Prize of Poetry "La Porte des Poetes" (Paris, France, 2007)

External links
https://web.archive.org/web/20110720135949/http://hispanismo.cervantes.es/hispanistas_ficha.asp?DOCN=10890
https://web.archive.org/web/20091004012709/http://www.fundacionneruda.org/distinciones_fundacion_neruda.htm
http://paginadeandresmorales.blogspot.com/
https://web.archive.org/web/20110718161158/http://www.zurgai.com/Colaborador.asp?IdColaborador=486
https://www.webcitation.org/query?url=http://www.geocities.com/apuntesmorales/index.html&date=2009-10-26+20:42:46
http://www.intelinet.org/eboli/eboli01/eboli_0119.htm#anchor254282

Living people
Chilean male poets
Chilean people of Croatian descent
1962 births
20th-century Chilean poets
20th-century Chilean male writers
21st-century Chilean poets
21st-century Chilean male writers